"This Is Not a Love Song" is a single released by English post-punk band Public Image Ltd in 1983. It is the band's biggest commercial hit, peaking at No. 5 on the UK Singles Chart and at No. 3 on the Irish Singles Chart.

The 12" remixed version of the song is featured on Commercial Zone as "Love Song". A re-recorded version of the song is featured on PiL's fourth studio album This Is What You Want... This Is What You Get and includes a horn section.

Track listing
7" vinyl – A|B Virgin 105 938
"This Is Not a Love Song" – 3:30
"Public Image" – 2:58

12" maxi – Virgin 600 997
"This Is Not a Love Song" – 4:27
"Blue Water" – 3:46
"This Is Not a Love Song (Remixed version)" – 4:27
"Public Image" – 2:58

Chart performance

References

1983 singles
1983 songs
Public Image Ltd songs
Songs written by John Lydon
Virgin Records singles
Songs written by Keith Levene